Matthias Küntzel (born 1955), is a German political scientist and historian. He was an external research associate at the Vidal Sassoon Center for the Study of Antisemitism (SICSA) at the Hebrew University of Jerusalem from 2004-2015. Currently, he is a member of the German Council on Foreign Relations DGAP, of the German Historical Association (VHD), of the Association for the Study of the Middle East and Africa ASMEA and of the Advisory Board of UANI (United Against Nuclear Iran).

Career
From 1984 to 1988, Küntzel served as a senior advisor for the German Green Party caucus in the Bundestag. He was member of the Communist League (Kommunistischer Bund, KB) and part of the Anti-Germans movement. Between 1992 and 2021 he held a tenured part-time position as a teacher of political science at a technical college in Hamburg, Germany. 

In 1991, he received his doctorate, summa cum laude, in Political Science at the University of Hamburg. His thesis Bonn & the Bomb. German Politics and the Nuclear Option (London: Pluto Press) was published in English in 1995.

In 2011, Matthias Küntzel was presented with the Anti-Defamation League’s (ADL) Paul Ehrlich-Günther K. Schwerin Human Rights Award in Palm Beach, Florida. “Matthias Küntzel has a long and distinguished record in speaking out against anti-Semitism and warning his readers in his native Germany and elsewhere about the dangers posed by this age-old virus that has no known cure,” said Abraham H. Foxman, ADL National Director, in presenting the award. 

In 2022, the German-Israeli Society in Hanover awarded him the 

Since 2001, his main field of research and writing have been anti-Semitism in current Islamic thinking, Islamism, Islamism and National Socialism, Iran, German and Western policies towards the Middle East and Iran. His essays and articles have been translated into sixteen languages and published inter alia in The New Republic, The Wall Street Journal, The Israel Journal of Foreign Affairs, The Weekly Standard, Telos, Policy Review, The Jerusalem Post, Der Standard, Spiegel Online, Die Welt, Die Zeit and Internationale Politik.

Work

In 2005, he discovered antisemitic tracts at the Iranian stands at the Frankfurt Book Fair, an incident he wrote about in the Wall Street Journal. 
In 2006 he joined the Board of Directors of Scholars for Peace in the Middle East, serving until 2011. He was a panelist at the 2006 Paris conference "Les démocraties face au défi islamiste" ("The democracies in the face of the Islamist challenge"), organized by the Center for Security Policy and the Institut pour la Défense de la Démocratie.

In 2007, Telos Press (New York, NY) published his book Jihad and Jew-Hatred. Islamism, Nazism and the Roots of 9/11. In 2008, he presented "Jihad and Jew-Hatred in the USA" at numerous universities (Stanford University, Columbia University, UCLA, UC-Santa Cruz, UC-Irvine, SUNY-Buffalo, University of Maine, and the Cooper Union). 
The book was criticized by Gilbert Achcar as "a fantasy-based narrative pasted together out of secondary sources and thirdhand reports; it aims to demonstrate that there is a direct line of descent from Amin al-Husseini and Hassan al-Banna through Gamal Abdel-Nasser to Osama bin Laden." Jeffrey Goldberg reviewing the book in the New York Times called it a „bracing, even startling, book“ and an „invaluable contribution“: „Küntzel makes a bold and consequential argument: the dissemination of European models of anti-Semitism among Muslims was not haphazard, but an actual project of the Nazi Party, meant to turn Muslims against Jews and Zionism. Küntzel marshals impressive evidence to back his case, but he sometimes oversimplifies.“

He also spoke at conferences organized inter alia by the American Enterprise Institute, the Israel Project, the Anti-Defamation League, and the Jewish Institute for National Security Affairs, and at the “Global Forum For Combating Antisemitism” at Israel's Ministry of Foreign Affairs. He participated in an international academic workshop on “Antisemitism in the 21st Century: Manifestations, Implications and Consequences”, organized by the Center for Advanced Holocaust Studies of the United States Holocaust Museum.

In 2009, he spoke at the “London Conference on Combating Antisemitism”, organized by the Foreign and Commonwealth Office of the United Kingdom, and published his book The Germans and Iran: The Past and Present of a Fateful Friendship (German publisher: Wolf Jobst Siedler, Berlin). 2012 the persian translation of this book by Michael Mobasheri was published in Cologne-Germany(Forough-Publishing Cologne). In 2010 he became a guest commentator on Germany's main public radio station, Deutschlandradio Kultur, and addressed the “Second Conference of the Interparliamentary Coalition on Combating Antisemitism” in Ottawa, Canada. In 2011, he received the ADL's Ehrlich-Schwerin Human Rights Prize and spoke at the international scholars conference on “Resurgent Antisemitism: Global Perspectives”, organized by the Institute for the Study of Contemporary Antisemitism at Indiana University.

In 2012, he spoke on behalf of the Henry Jackson Society to Britain's House of Commons on the 70th anniversary of the Wannsee Conference, and at the Konrad Adenauer Foundation in Brussels on the current meaning of the Auschwitz day of remembrance. He was the main speaker at a rally against the award of the Adorno Award to Judith Butler, held in front of St. Paul's Church in Frankfurt. The Germans and Iran was republished in Persian Translation by Michael Mobasheri. He also published Germany, Iran and the Bomb (LIT, Münster), which was also a reply to Günter Grass. In 2013 he joined Rabbi Abraham Cooper from the Simon Wiesenthal Center at a press conference in Berlin about the anti-Semitic remarks of Jacob Augstein, a popular German journalist.

His most recent book „Nazis and der Nahe Osten. Wie der islamische Antisemitismus entstand“ (Nazis and the Middle East: How Islamic antisemitism came into being) was published in 2019 by Hentrich & Hentrich (Leipzig/Berlin). "Through numerous publications, Matthias Küntzel has become the most important German voice in this field," says a review of this book, edited by Michael Wildt and written by Philip Henning. “With this book, he is making an overdue contribution to the education and awareness of a topic which, as the author rightly complains, plays too little a role in scientific and general public discourse.“ 

Controversy over cancelled lecture at the University of Leeds
On 14 March 2007 Küntzel was due to address University of Leeds in England on the topic ‘Hitler’s Legacy: Islamic Antisemitism in the Middle East.’ The university's student Islamic society complained about what they called the lecture's "provocative" title and the University removed the words "Hitler" and "Islamic" with the title amended to read: "The Nazi Legacy: The Export of Anti-Semitism to the Middle East." However, several hours before the talk was due to take place, the talk was unexpectedly cancelled due to "security concerns," following protest e-mails from some of the university's Muslim students claiming the lecture was an "open racist attack".

Dr. Küntzel said he had given similar addresses (at Yale University, as well as universities in Jerusalem and Vienna) around the world and there had been no problems. "I know this is sometimes a controversial topic," he said, "but I am accustomed to that and I have the ability to calm people down. It's not a problem for me at all. My impression was that they wanted to avoid the issue in order to keep the situation calm. My feeling is that this is a kind of censorship."
Dr. Küntzel also said that the contents of emails described to him did not overtly threaten violence but "they were very, very strongly worded". He added: "It's stupid, because I also talk about Christian anti-semitism." Members of the German department at Leeds accused the university of "selling-out" academic freedom.

Awards and honors
In 2007, Küntzel's book Jihad and Jew-Hatred: Islamism, Nazism and the Roots of 9/11 was awarded the Grand Prize at the 2007 London Book Festival.

In 2008, Küntzel's book Jihad and Jew-Hatred: Islamism, Nazism and the Roots of 9/11 won the Gold Award for Religion at the 12th annual Independent Publisher Book Awards in Los Angeles.

In 2011, Matthias Küntzel was presented with the Anti-Defamation-League's (ADL) Paul Ehrlich-Günther K. Schwerin Human Rights Award.

In 2011, Matthias Küntzel was (together with Colin Meade) the recipient of the Best Book Review Award of the Journal for the Study of Antisemitism.

In 2022, the German-Israeli Society in Hanover awarded him the 

Books
 Nazis und der Nahe Osten. Wie der islamische Antisemitismus entstand, Hentrich & Hentrich 2019, 
 Germany and Iran: From the Aryan Axis to the Nuclear Threshold, New York, 2014.
 Deutschland, Iran und die Bombe, LIT Verlag 2012.
 آلمانی‌ها و ایران- تاریخ گذشته و معاصر یک دوستی بدفرجام. ترجمه مایکل مبشری(2012). ISBN 978-3-943147-18-6
 
 Die Deutschen und der Iran, wjs-Verlag 2009. 
 Islamischer Antisemitismus und deutsche Politik,  LIT Verlag 2007
 Jihad and Jew-Hatred: Islamism, Nazism and the Roots of 9/11, Telos Press, New York, 2007.
 Djihad und Judenhaß: über den neuen antijüdischen Krieg, Ça Ira, Freiburg, 2002
 Der Weg in den Krieg. Deutschland, die Nato und das Kosovo (The Road to War. Germany, Nato and the Kosovo), Elefanten Press, Berlin, 2000
 Hitler’s Willing Executioners: Goldhagen und die deutsche Linke oder: Die Gegenwart des Holocaust (Goldhagen and the German Left or: The Presence of the Holocaust), ed. Matthias Küntzel, Ulrike Becker, Klaus Thörner et al., Elefanten Press, Berlin, 1997
 Bonn & the Bomb: German politics and the nuclear option, Transnational Institute (TNI), Pluto Press, London; Boulder, Colorado, 1995. 
 Bonn und die Bombe: deutsche Atomwaffenpolitik von Adenauer bis Brandt, Campus-Verlag, Frankfurt/Main; New York, 1992

Notes

External links

 Homepage
 English articles at matthiaskuentzel.de
 Interview with Matthias Kuntzel from the U.S. Holocaust Memorial Museum

Anti-Germans (political current)
German political scientists
1955 births
Living people
Scholars of antisemitism
Islam and antisemitism
Academic staff of the Hebrew University of Jerusalem
University of Hamburg alumni